The women's 3000 metres steeplechase at the 2014 World Junior Championships in Athletics was held at Hayward Field from 24 to 26 July.

Medalists

Records

Results

Heats

results

heats

Heat 1

Heat 2

Final

References

External links
 WJC14 3000 metres steeplechase schedule

3000 metres steeplechase
Steeplechase at the World Athletics U20 Championships
2014 in women's athletics